Arnes Airport  was located  northeast of Arnes, Manitoba, Canada.

References

Defunct airports in Manitoba